Malaysian State Roads System are the secondary roads in Malaysia with a total length of 247,027.61 km (as of December 2021). The construction and maintenance works of state roads in Malaysia is managed by Malaysian Public Works Department (JKR) of each state and funded by state governments. The standard of the state roads is similar with the federal roads except for the coding system, where the codes for state roads begin with state codes followed by route number, for example Johor State Route J32 is labeled as J32. If a state road crosses the state border, the state code will change, for example route B20 in Salak Tinggi, Selangor will change to N20 after crossing the border of Negeri Sembilan to Nilai.

List of state codes in Malaysian State Roads system
The codes assigned to each state is the same as those of the car number plates except for Sabah.

A: 
B: 
C: 
D: 
J: 
K: 
M: 
N: 
P: 
R: 
SA: 
T: 
W :  (not used)
Q:

Municipal roads
Municipal roads are usually not given a route number, as they are maintained mainly by the local councils. An exception is some major roads in Shah Alam, the capital of Selangor. For example, Persiaran Raja Muda in Shah Alam was given route number BSA-3.

See also
 Road signs in Malaysia
 National Speed Limits
 Malaysian Expressway System
 Malaysian Federal Roads System

References

Malaysian Public Works Department
Roads in Malaysia